Yanggu County (Yanggu-gun) is a county in Gangwon Province, South Korea.

The northern part of Yanggu County was part of the front line for much of the Korean War, and now borders the Demilitarized Zone. Several Korean War battle sites are located in Yanggu County, including Bloody Ridge, Heartbreak Ridge, and Hill 1179 (Daeusan).

Yanggu is located in what is claimed to be the geographic center of the Korean peninsula. Dochon-ri village in Nam-myeon in Yanggu is called the "navel of Korea".

Climate
Yanggu has a monsoon-influenced humid continental climate (Köppen: Dwa) with cold, dry winters and hot, rainy summers.

Twin towns – sister cities

Yanggu is twinned with:
 Chizu, Japan
 Jianli, China
 Saint-Mandé, France

References

External links
Yanggu County government home page

 
Counties of Gangwon Province, South Korea
Biosphere reserves of South Korea
Geographical centres